Joanna Vanderham (born 17 October 1990) is a Scottish actress. She was nominated for an International Emmy Award for her debut role in the Sky One crime drama The Runaway (2011).

Early life
Vanderham was born in Perth and grew up in Scone and Dundee. Her father Tom, a Dutch businessman, and mother Jill Belch, a Scottish professor of cardiovascular research at Ninewells Hospital, divorced when she was a child. She has two sisters and a brother. She attended Robert Douglas Memorial School in Scone and then the High School of Dundee. She then went on to study acting at the Royal Welsh College of Music & Drama in Cardiff.

Career
Vanderham made her onscreen debut in 2011 as Cathy Connor in the Sky TV six-part crime drama The Runaway, an adaptation of the novel by Martina Cole.  She also had a supporting role in the BBC One biographical drama Young James Herriot.

From 2012 to 2013 over two series, Vanderham starred as Denise Lovett in the BBC television series The Paradise, written by Bill Gallagher and loosely based on the novel Au Bonheur des Dames by Émile Zola. She made her film debut as Margo in What Maisie Knew with Alexander Skarsgård and Julianne Moore.

Vanderham played society girl Pamela Luscombe in the BBC drama Dancing on the Edge, directed by Stephen Poliakoff. In 2015, she appeared as Katherine "Kitty" McVitie in BBC Two period drama series Banished and Marian Maudsley in the BBC One romance television film The Go-Between.

Vanderham received a Commendation at the 2016 Ian Charleson Awards for her performance as Queen Anne in Richard III at the Almeida Theatre in London.

Also in 2016, Vanderham starred in the romance television film The Boy with the Topknot opposite Sacha Dhawan. The following year, she played Claire Elliot in the miniseries One of Us (also known as Retribution) and the younger version of Vanessa Redgrave's character Flora in the two-part drama Man in an Orange Shirt.

In 2019, Vanderham joined the main cast of the American action series Warrior as Penelope Blake. She played Atropos, a recurring character in the fifth season of DC's Legend's of Tomorrow. She starred as DS Amanda Drummond opposite Dougray Scott in the 2021 BritBox series Crime, an adaptation of the novel of the same name by Irvine Welsh.

Personal life
Vanderham lives in Hackney, East London.

Filmography

Film

Television

Stage

Awards and nominations

References

External links

 
 
 

Living people
1990 births
21st-century Scottish actresses
Alumni of the Royal Welsh College of Music & Drama
People educated at the High School of Dundee
People from Perth and Kinross
Scottish film actresses
Scottish people of Dutch descent
Scottish Shakespearean actresses
Scottish stage actresses
Scottish television actresses